George Latham Fletcher (May 19, 1874 – March 23, 1929) was an American jurist and Democratic politician. Prior to spending a number of years as a state circuit court judge, he served as a member of the Virginia Senate, representing the state's 11th district from 1908 to 1916.

Fletcher's father-in-law was Marshall F. Moore, a Union military officer and former governor of Washington Territory.

References

External links
 
 

1874 births
1929 deaths
Democratic Party Virginia state senators
People from Warrenton, Virginia
20th-century American judges
20th-century American politicians
University of Richmond alumni
University of Virginia School of Law alumni